Sultan-ul-Qaum Sardar Jassa Singh Ahluwalia  (3 May 1718 – 23 October 1783) was a Sikh leader during the period of the Sikh Confederacy, being the Supreme Leader of the  Dal Khalsa. He was also Misldar of the Ahluwalia Misl. This period was an interlude, lasting roughly from the time of the death of Banda Bahadur in 1716 to the founding of the Sikh Empire in 1801. He founded the Kapurthala State in 1772.

Early life 

Jassa Singh was born on 3 May 1718 CE, in the Ahlu village near Lahore, Punjab. Originally known as Jassa Singh Kalal, he styled himself as Ahluwalia after his ancestral village.

Jassa Singh is described as a member of the Kalal or Wine distiller caste. During the period of Kharak Singh (r. 1870-1877) a Bhatti Rajput origin story was also created. According to this tradition, the Bhatti Rajputs descended from Krishna, and one of them - Rana Har Rai - had to leave the throne of Jaisalmer for refusing to marry his niece to the Mughal emperor Akbar. Har Rai migrated to Punjab, where his descendants married with the Jats, and gradually they became Jats. Starting with Sadhu Singh (also called Sadho or Sadda Singh), they married with Kalals, and the family came to be known as "Ahluwalia Kalal". British administrator Lepel Griffin, who wrote an account of the rulers of Punjab, dismissed this tradition as fictitious.

According to the dynasty's account, Sadhu's Singh's great-grandson Badar Singh and his wife remained childless for a long time, and sought blessings from Guru Gobind Singh. As a result, Jassa Singh was born to them.

The formation of the Dal Khalsa and the Misls 

In 1733, Zakariya Khan Bahadur attempted to negotiate peace with the Sikhs by offering them a jagir, the title Nawab to their leader, and unimpeded access to the Harmandir Sahib. After discussion at a Sarbat Khalsa, Kapur Singh was elected leader of the Sikhs and took the title of Nawab. He combined the various Sikh militias into two groups; the Taruna Dal and the Budda Dal, which would collectively be known as the Dal Khalsa. Sikh militias over 40 years of age would be part of the Budda Dal and Sikh militias under 40 years were part of the Taruna Dal. The Taruna Dal was further divided in five jathas, each with 1300 to 2000 men and a separate drum and banner. The area of operations of each Dal, or army, was Hari ke Pattan, where the Sutlej river and Beas River meet; the Taruna Dal would control the area east of Hari ke Pattan while the Budha Dal would control the area west of it. The purpose of the Budda Dal, the veteran group, was to protect Gurdwaras and train the Taruna Dal, while the Taruna Dal would act as combat troops. However, in 1735, the agreement between Zakariya Khan and Nawab Kapur Singh broke down and the Dal Khalsa retreated to the Sivalik Hills to regroup.
Later the command of Dal Khalsa was taken by Jassa Singh Ahluwalia who was an able and powerful administrator, even displaced & brought Mughal’s centre of power at the time (Red Fort) under Khalsa flag.
He made the foundation of Khalsa firm for future generations to lead.

Military campaigns

Nadir Shah's invasion 

In 1739, Nadir Shah, the Persian ruler, invaded much of Northern India, including Punjab, defeating the Mughals at the Battle of Karnal in 1739, he plundered the city of Delhi (Shahjahanabad) robbing it of treasures like the Peacock throne, the Kohinoor diamond and the Darya-i-Noor diamond. Meanwhile, all the Khalsa bands got together and passed a resolution that Nadir shah had plundered the city of Delhi and now he is taking Indian women as slaves to his country. Sikhs made a plan to free all the slaves. Jassa Singh Ahluwalia was 21 years old at that time, he planned raids to free all slaves. He along with other Sikh bands attacked Nadir shah forces, freed all slaves and sent those slaves back to their families safely.

Ahluwalia participated in many battles as well where he proved himself to be a natural leader. In a 1748 meeting of the Sarbat Khalsa, Nawab Kapur Singh appointed him as his successor. His followers awarded him the title Sultan-ul-Qaum (King of the Nation).

The raids of Ahmed Shah Abdali 

Ahmad Shah Durrani, Nader Shah's seniormost general, succeeded to the throne of Afghanistan when Shah was murdered in June 1747. He established his own dynasty, the Sadozai, which was the name of the Pashtun khel to which he belonged.

Starting from December 1747 till 1769, Abdali made a total of nine incursions into the north India. His repeated invasions weakened the Mughal administration of North India. At the Third Battle of Panipat, he along with Nawab of Oudh and Rohillas, defeated the Marathas, who after a treaty signed in 1752 became the protector of the Mughal throne at Delhi and were controlling much of North India, and Kashmir. However they were never able to subdue the Sikhs in the Punjab.

Help of Sikhs to Jats of Bharatpur 
Suraj Mal (1707-63) was the founder of Jat State of Bharatpur. He was killed on 25 December 1763 near Delhi by Najib ul Daulah, the Ruhilaa chief who had been appointed Mir Bakshi and Regent at Delhi by Ahmed Shah Durrani. Suraj Mal’s son Jawahar Singh sought help from Sikhs who responded with a Sikh force of 40,000 under the command of Sardar Jassa Singh Ahluwalia. The Sikhs crossed the Yamuna on 20 February 1764 and attacked the surrounding areas. Najib ul Daulah rushed back to Delhi thereby relieving the pressure on Bharatpur. Najib ul Daulah suffered another defeat at hands of Sikhs under Ahluwalia after a battle that lasted 20 days in the trans-Yamuna area at Barari Ghat, 20 km north of Delhi. He retired to Red Fort on 9 January 1765 and within a month Sikhs defeated Najib ul Daulah again in Nakhas (horse market) and in Sabzi Mandi.

Jawahar Singh also engaged 25,000 Sikh forces under command of Sardar Jassa Singh against the Rajput Raja of Jaipur in the Battle of Maonda and Mandholi and the Battle of Kama and was defeated in both.

Rescue of Maratha women by Sikhs

An account appearing in the 19th century texts, Munshi Kanhaiyya Lal's Tareekh-e-Punjab and Gian Singh's Shamsher Khalsa, credits Jassa Singh with rescuing Hindu women captured by Ahmad Shah Durrani after the Third Battle of Panipat in 1761. According to this account, after defeating the Marathas, Abdali captured thousands of prisoners, including 22,000 women, who were being taken to Afghanistan as slaves. When Jassa Singh learned of it, he attacked the Afghan army at Goindval on the Sutlej river, rescued the women, and sent them back to their families. Thereafter, he was known as Bandi chhor, or the Liberator of captives.

The Sixth Abdali Incursion, 1762 
In early 1762, news had reached to Ahmad Shah Abdali in Afghanistan of the defeat of his general, Nur-ud-Din Bamezai, at the hands of the Sikhs who were fast spreading themselves out over Punjab and had declared their leader, Misldar Jassa Singh Ahluwalia, King of Lahore. To rid his Indian dominion of them once and for all, he set out from Kandahar. The Battle of Kup was fought on 5 February 1762 between the Afghan forces of Ahmad Shah Abdali (40,000 soldiers) and civilian Sikhs. The Afghans launched a surprise attack on a civilian Sikh camp, consisting mainly of women, children and elders. The Sikh Camp only had around 5000-7000 Sikh warriors. These warriors formed a human shield around the Sikh civilians, and fought the Afghans bravely, killing thousands of Afghan soldiers. However, Abdali was able to break the ring and carried a full-scale massacre. Ahmad Shah's forces killed several thousand Sikh civilians.

In a fresh Afghan invasion of the upper Punjab, Ahmad Shah Durrani with his 100,000 Soldiers reached Malerkotla, west of Sirhind, then attacked a 20,000 Sikh army escorting 40,000 women and children, along with the elderly. In one of their worst defeats—known as Vadda Ghalughara—the Sikhs lost perhaps 5–10,000+ soldiers and had 20,000 civilians massacred. The Afghan forces of Ahmad Shah Durrani came out victorious with the night ambush on the large convoy.

Despite the Ghalughara disaster, by the month of May, the Sikhs were up in arms again. Under Jassa Singh, they defeated the Afghan faujdar of Sirhind in the Battle of Harnaulgarh. By autumn, the Sikhs had regained enough confidence to foregather in large numbers at Amritsar to celebrate Diwali. Abdali made a mild effort to win over them and sent an envoy with proposals for a treaty of peace. The Sikhs were in no mood for peace and insulted the emissary. Abdali did not waste any time and turned up at the outskirts of Amritsar.

The Battle of Pipli Sahib was fought in the grey light of a sun in total eclipse. It ended when the sunless day was blacked out by a moonless night with the adversaries retiring from the field: The Sikhs to the fastness of the jungles of the Lakhi (the forests of a hundred thousand trees located in Central Punjab) and Abdali behind the walled safety of Lahore.

Battle of Delhi
The Sikhs under Baghel Singh had been raiding Delhi since 1764 but without success. On 11 March 1783 the combined Sikh army of Baghel Singh, Jassa Singh Ahluwalia and Jassa Singh Ramgarhia conquered the Red fort of Delhi hosting Nishan Sahib.

Death and legacy 

Jassa Singh Ahluwalia died on 23 October 1783 in Amritsar

Nawab Jassa Singh Ahluwalia Government College (NJSA Government College) in Kapurthala, established in 1856 by Raja Randhir Singh of Kaputhala is named after him. A commemorative postage stamp on Jassa Singh Ahluwalia was issued by Government of India on 4 April 1985.

In popular culture

Television
 In the 2010 historical TV series Maharaja Ranjit Singh telecasted on DD National, the character of Jassa Singh Ahluwalia is portrayed by Shahbaz Khan.

See also 
 Banda Bahadur
 Baba Deep Singh
 Nawab Kapur Singh Virk
 Dal Khalsa

References

Bibliography 

 

 

Punjabi people
History of Punjab
Sikh warriors
People from Kapurthala
History of Sikhism
1718 births
1783 deaths
Nihang
Kapurthala State
Sikh Jathedars
Jathedars of Akal Takht
Indian monarchs
Maharajas of Kapurthala
Ahluwalia